Doorus Demesne wedge tomb is a wedge-shaped gallery grave and National Monument located in County Galway, Ireland.

Location

Description
The chamber, measuring 2.5 meters × 1.3 meters, is covered by an enormous roof-stone which measures 2.4 meters in length, 2.1 meters in width and 0.3 meters in depth. There is a huge amount of cairn material, nearly 1 meter in depth, on top of the roof-stone and it is supported by two large side-stones (one on each side) and an equally large back-stone at NE. There is some evidence of a gallery in front of the NW side-stone but none on the SW side. The monument consists of a simple chamber, with sides and back formed of single stones. The chamber is covered by a roofstone above which is built a stack of field stones.

References

National Monuments in County Galway
Archaeological sites in County Galway
Tombs in the Republic of Ireland